The Association of Diabetes Care & Education Specialists (formerly American Association of Diabetes Educators, or AADE) is a multidisciplinary membership organization for healthcare professionals who specialize in teaching patients about diabetes and how to self-manage the disease.

ADCES was founded in 1973 as the American Association of Diabetes Educators. In January 2020, the organization rebranded to its current name, Association of Diabetes Care and Education Specialists.

ADCES represents and supports diabetes educators by providing members with the resources to stay abreast of the current research, methods and trends in the field and by offering opportunities to network and collaborate with other healthcare professionals.

Publications 
The Science of Diabetes Self-Management and Care, formerly The Diabetes Educator
ADCES in Practice, formerly AADE in Practice

See also 
Certified diabetes educator
Advanced Diabetes Management Certification

References

External links 
 

Medical and health organizations based in Illinois
Non-profit organizations based in Chicago
Medical and health professional associations in Chicago